Charles Hopewell (September 22, 1861 – May 15, 1931) was mayor of Ottawa from 1909 to 1912.

He was born in March Township in 1861. During his term in office, he negotiated grants in lieu of taxes with the federal government. He also served as magistrate after his term as mayor. Hopewell served for many years on the board of the Union Mission, a shelter for homeless men.

He drowned in the Ottawa River in 1931, an apparent suicide. He is buried in Beechwood Cemetery.

Hopewell Avenue & Hopewell Avenue Public School in the city was named in honour of this former mayor.

References 

Chain of Office: Biographical Sketches of the Early Mayors of Ottawa (1847-1948), Dave Mullington

1861 births
1931 deaths
Mayors of Ottawa
1931 suicides
Suicides by drowning in Canada